A Clean Break: A New Strategy for Securing the Realm (commonly known as the "Clean Break" report) is a policy document that was prepared in 1996 by a study group led by Richard Perle for Benjamin Netanyahu, the then Prime Minister of Israel. The report explained a new approach to solving Israel's security problems in the Middle East with an emphasis on "Western values." It has since been criticized for advocating an aggressive new policy including the removal of Saddam Hussein from power in Iraq and the containment of Syria by engaging in proxy warfare and highlighting its possession of "weapons of mass destruction". Certain parts of the policies set forth in the paper were rejected by Netanyahu.

Report
According to the report's preamble, it was written by the Study Group on a New Israeli Strategy Toward 2000, which was a part of the Institute for Advanced Strategic and Political Studies.

Former United States Assistant Secretary of Defense Richard Perle was the "Study Group Leader," but the final report included ideas from Douglas Feith, James Colbert, Charles Fairbanks, Jr., Jonathan Torop, David Wurmser, Meyrav Wurmser, and IASPS president Robert Loewenberg.

Contents
The content of the report is organized into an introduction followed by six sections. The report interleaves within its main commentary text a series of "key passages of a possible speech:"

While there are those who will counsel continuity, Israel has the opportunity to make a clean break; it can forge a peace process and strategy based on an entirely new intellectual foundation, one that restores strategic initiative and provides the nation the room to engage every possible energy on rebuilding Zionism, the starting point of which must be economic reform.

The introduction specifically proposes three new policies:
 Rather than pursuing a "comprehensive peace" with the entire Arab world, Israel should work jointly with Jordan and Turkey to "contain, destabilize, and roll-back" those entities that are threats to all three.
 Changing the nature of relations with the Palestinians, specifically reserving the right of "hot pursuit" anywhere within Palestinian territory as well as attempting to promote alternatives to Arafat's leadership.
 Changing relations with the United States stressing self-reliance and strategic cooperation.

"This can only be done if Israel takes serious steps to terminate aid, which prevents economic reform."

"A New Approach to Peace"
While the previous government, and many abroad, may emphasize land for peace—which placed Israel in the position of cultural, economic, political, diplomatic, and military retreat—the new government can promote Western values and traditions. Such an approach, which will be well received in the United States, includes peace for peace, peace through strength and self reliance: the balance of power.

"Securing the Northern Border"
Syria challenges Israel on Lebanese soil. An effective approach, and one with which American can sympathize, would be if Israel seized the strategic initiative along its northern borders by engaging Hizballah, Syria, and Iran, as the principal agents of aggression in Lebanon, including by:
 striking Syria's drug-money and counterfeiting infrastructure in Lebanon, all of which focuses on Razi Qanan.

 paralleling Syria's behavior by establishing the precedent that Syrian territory is not immune to attacks emanating from Lebanon by Israeli proxy forces...

Israel also can take this opportunity to remind the world of the nature of the Syrian regime. Syria repeatedly breaks its word. It violated numerous agreements with the Turks, and has betrayed the United States by continuing to occupy Lebanon in violation of the Taef agreement in 1989. Instead, Syria staged a sham election, installed a quisling regime, and forced Lebanon to sign a "Brotherhood Agreement" in 1991, that terminated Lebanese sovereignty. And Syria has begun colonizing Lebanon with hundreds of thousands of Syrians, while killing tens of thousands of its own citizens at a time, as it did in only three days in 1983 in Hama. ... Given the nature of the regime in Damascus, it is both natural and moral that Israel abandon the slogan comprehensive peace and move to contain Syria, drawing attention to its weapons of mass destruction programs, and rejecting land for peace deals on the Golan Heights.

"Moving to a Traditional Balance of Power Strategy"
Israel can shape its strategic environment, in cooperation with Turkey and Jordan, by weakening, containing, and even rolling back Syria. This effort can focus on removing Saddam Hussein from power in Iraq—an important Israeli strategic objective in its own right—as a means of foiling Syria’s regional ambitions.

Since Iraq's future could affect the strategic balance in the Middle East profoundly, it would be understandable that Israel has an interest in supporting the Hashemites in their efforts to redefine Iraq, including such measures as: visiting Jordan as the first official state visit, even before a visit to the United States, of the new Netanyahu government; supporting King Hussein by providing him with some tangible security measures to protect his regime against Syrian subversion; encouraging—through influence in the U.S. business community—investment in Jordan to structurally shift Jordan's economy away from dependence on Iraq; and diverting Syria's attention by using Lebanese opposition elements to destabilize Syrian control of Lebanon. ... Were the Hashemites to control Iraq, they could use their influence over Najf to help Israel wean the south Lebanese Shia away from Hizballah, Iran, and Syria. Shia retain strong ties to the Hashemites: the Shia venerate foremost the Prophet's family, the direct descendants of which—and in whose veins the blood of the Prophet flows—is King Hussein.

Most important, it is understandable that Israel has an interest supporting diplomatically, militarily and operationally Turkey’s and Jordan’s actions against Syria, such as securing tribal alliances with Arab tribes that cross into Syrian territory and are hostile to the Syrian ruling elite.

"Changing the Nature of Relations with the Palestinians"
Israel has a chance to forge a new relationship between itself and the Palestinians. First and foremost, Israel’s efforts to secure its streets may require hot pursuit into Palestinian-controlled areas, a justifiable practice with which Americans can sympathize.

To emphasize the point that Israel regards the actions of the PLO problematic, but not the Arab people, Israel might want to consider making a special effort to reward friends and advance human rights among Arabs.

"Forging A New U.S.–Israeli Relationship"
Israel can make a clean break from the past and establish a new vision for the U.S.–Israeli partnership based on self-reliance, maturity and mutuality—not one focused narrowly on territorial disputes. Israel's new strategy—based on a shared philosophy of peace through strength—reflects continuity with Western values by stressing that Israel is self-reliant, does not need U.S. troops in any capacity to defend it, including on the Golan Heights, and can manage its own affairs.

To reinforce this point, the Prime Minister can use his forthcoming visit to announce that Israel is now mature enough to cut itself free immediately from at least U.S. economic aid and loan guarantees at least, which prevent economic reform.

"Conclusions – Transcending the Arab-Israeli Conflict"
Israel's new agenda can signal a clean break by abandoning a policy which assumed exhaustion and allowed strategic retreat by reestablishing the principle of preemption, rather than retaliation alone and by ceasing to absorb blows to the nation without response."
"Israel's new strategic agenda can shape the regional environment in ways that grant Israel the room to refocus its energies back to where they are most needed: to rejuvenate its national idea, which can only come through replacing Israel's socialist foundations with a more sound footing; and to overcome its exhaustion, which threatens the survival of the nation.

Ultimately, Israel can do more than simply manage the Arab-Israeli conflict though war. No amount of weapons or victories will grant Israel the peace its seeks. When Israel is on a sound economic footing, and is free, powerful, and healthy internally, it will no longer simply manage the Arab–Israeli conflict; it will transcend it. As a senior Iraqi opposition leader said recently: Israel must rejuvenate and revitalize its moral and intellectual leadership. It is an important—if not the most important—element in the history of the Middle East. Israel—proud, wealthy, solid, and strong— would be the basis of a truly new and peaceful Middle East.

Influence
Certain aspects of the policies set forth in the "Clean Break" report were rejected by Netanyahu.

Brian Whitaker reported in a September 2002 article  published in The Guardian that "With several of the Clean Break paper's authors now holding key positions in Washington, the plan for Israel to transcend its foes by reshaping the Middle East looks a good deal more achievable today than it did in 1996. Americans may even be persuaded to give up their lives to achieve it."

In March 2003, Patrick J. Buchanan, referring to the 2003 invasion of Iraq and the report, wrote, "Their plan, which urged Israel to re-establish 'the principle of preemption,' has now been imposed by Perle, Feith, Wurmser & Co. on the United States."

Ian Buruma wrote in August 2003 in The New York Times that:
Douglas Feith and Richard Perle advised Netanyahu, who was prime minister in 1996, to make "a clean break" from the Oslo accords with the Palestinians. They also argued that Israeli security would be served best by regime change in surrounding countries. Despite the current mess in Iraq, this is still a commonplace in Washington. In Paul Wolfowitz's words, "The road to peace in the Middle East goes through Baghdad." It has indeed become an article of faith (literally in some cases) in Washington that American and Israeli interests are identical, but this was not always so, and "Jewish interests" are not the main reason for it now.

Buruma continues:
What we see, then, is not a Jewish conspiracy, but a peculiar alliance of evangelical Christians, foreign-policy hard-liners, lobbyists for the Israeli government and neoconservatives, a number of whom happen to be Jewish. But the Jews among them—Perle, Wolfowitz, William Kristol, editor of The Weekly Standard, et al.—are more likely to speak about freedom and democracy than about Halakha (Jewish law). What unites this alliance of convenience is a shared vision of American destiny and the conviction that American force and a tough Israeli line on the Arabs are the best ways to make the United States strong, Israel safe and the world a better place.

In 2005, David Martin, a CBS News National Security Correspondent, said in regards to the decision-making process that led to the war in Iraq that he "never saw any evidence that Richard Perle had any determining effect on US policy. He just wasn't in a position to do so."

George Packer, in his 2005 non-fiction analysis of the Iraq war The Assassins' Gate, explicates the Clean Break report "through the lens of Wurmser's subsequent AEI-published volume, which argued (in 1999) that America's taking out Saddam would solve Israel's strategic problems and leave the Palestinians essentially helpless."

In 2006, commentator Karen Kwiatkowski pointed to the similarities between the proposed actions in the Clean Break document and the subsequent 2003 invasion of Iraq. Soon after Phyllis Bennis pointed to the similarities between the proposals in the Clean Break document and the subsequent 2006 Lebanon War.

In 2006, Sidney Blumenthal noted the paper's relevance to potential Israeli bombing of Syria and Iran, writing that "In order to try to understand the neoconservative road map, senior national security professionals have begun circulating among themselves" the Clean Break "neocon manifesto." Soon after "Taki" of The American Conservative wrote that:
recently, Netanyahu suggested that President Bush had assured him Iran will be prevented from going nuclear. I take him at his word. Netanyahu seems to be the main mover in America's official adoption of the 1996 white paper A Clean Break, authored by him and American fellow neocons, which aimed to aggressively remake the strategic environments of Iraq, Palestine, Lebanon, Syria, and Iran. As they say in boxing circles, three down, two to go.

Analysis
Jason Vest wrote that the report was "a kind of US-Israeli neoconservative manifesto" and that it proposed "a mini-cold war in the Middle East, advocating the use of proxy armies for regime changes, destabilization and containment. Indeed, it even goes so far as to articulate a way to advance right-wing Zionism by melding it with missile-defense advocacy." He wrote that because of the shared organizational membership of the paper's authors the report provides "perhaps the most insightful window" into the "policy worldview" of the Jewish Institute for National Security Affairs and Center for Security Policy, two United States-based thinktanks.

An October 2003 editorial in The Nation criticized the Syria Accountability Act and connected it to the Clean Break report and authors:
To properly understand the Syria Accountability Act, one has to go back to a 1996 document, "A Clean Break: A New Strategy for Securing the Realm," drafted by a team of advisers to Benjamin Netanyahu in his run for prime minister of Israel. The authors included current Bush advisers Richard Perle and Douglas Feith. "Syria challenges Israel on Lebanese soil," they wrote, calling for "striking Syrian military targets in Lebanon, and should that prove insufficient, striking at select targets in Syria proper." No wonder Perle was delighted by the Israeli strike. "It will help the peace process," he told The Washington Post, adding later that the United States itself might have to attack Syria.

But what Perle means by "helping the peace process" is not resolving the conflict by bringing about a viable, sovereign Palestinian state but rather, as underscored in A Clean Break, "transcending the Arab-Israeli conflict" altogether by forcing the Arabs to accept most, if not all, of Israel's territorial conquests and its nuclear hegemony in the region.

John Dizard claimed there is evidence in the Clean Break document of Ahmed Chalabi's involvement. (Chalabi, an Iraqi politician, was an ardent opponent of Saddam Hussein.):
In the section on Iraq, and the necessity of removing Saddam Hussein, there was telltale "intelligence" from Chalabi and his old Jordanian Hashemite patron, Prince Hassan: "The predominantly Shi'a population of southern Lebanon has been tied for centuries to the Shi'a leadership in Najaf, Iraq, rather than Iran. Were the Hashemites to control Iraq, they could use their influence over Najaf to help Israel wean the south Lebanese Shi'a away from Hizbollah, Iran, and Syria. Shi'a retain strong ties to the Hashemites." Of course the Shia with "strong ties to the Hashemites" was the family of Ahmed Chalabi. Perle, Feith and other contributors to the "Clean Break" seemed not to recall the 15-year fatwa the clerics of Najaf proclaimed against the Iraqi Hashemites. Or the still more glaring fact, pointed out by Rashid Khalidi in his new book Resurrecting Empire, that Shiites are loyal only to descendants of the prophet Muhammad's son-in-law, Ali, and reject all other lineages, including the Hashemites. As Khalidi caustically notes, "Perle and his colleagues were here proposing the complete restructuring of a region whose history and religion their suggestions reveal they know hardly anything about." In short, the Iraqi component of the neocons "new strategy" was based on an ignorant fantasy of prospective Shia support for ties with Israel.

Professors John Mearsheimer and Stephen Walt wrote in their controversial and critical "The Israel Lobby" article of March 2006, published in the London Review of Books that the Clean Break paper
called for Israel to take steps to reorder the entire Middle East. Netanyahu did not follow their advice, but Feith, Perle and Wurmser were soon urging the Bush administration to pursue those same goals. The Ha’aretz columnist Akiva Eldar warned that Feith and Perle "are walking a fine line between their loyalty to American governments ... and Israeli interests".

Sidney Blumenthal criticized the report, writing:
Instead of trading land for peace, the neocons advocated tossing aside the Oslo agreements that established negotiations and demanding unconditional Palestinian acceptance of Likud's terms, peace for peace. Rather than negotiations with Syria, they proposed weakening, containing, and even rolling back Syria. They also advanced a wild scenario to redefine Iraq. Then King Hussein of Jordan would somehow become its ruler; and somehow this Sunni monarch would gain control of the Iraqi Shiites, and through them wean the south Lebanese Shia away from Hezbollah, Iran, and Syria.

Further reading
A Clean Break: A New Strategy for Securing the Realm, Institute for Advanced Strategic and Political Studies, July 2006
Neocon Middle East Policy: The 'Clean Break' Plan Damage Assessment, Adam Shapiro et al.

References

Foreign relations of Israel
Israeli–Palestinian conflict
Israeli–Lebanese conflict
Works about neoconservatism
Israel–United States relations
Foreign policy doctrines